Mohamed Ehab Youssef Ahmed Mahmoud (born 21 November 1989), known as Mohamed Mahmoud or Mohamed Ehab, is an Egyptian weightlifter, and World Champion competing in the 77 kg category until 2018 and 81 kg starting in 2018 after the International Weightlifting Federation reorganized the categories.

Early life
Ehab was born in Faiyum, Egypt a city located 100 kilometers southwest from Cairo. He was introduced to weightlifting by his father. Ehab started training with a coach at the age of 8 after his brother took him to a weightlifting gym. He went on to join the Egyptian national team at the age of 15 at a body weight of 56 kg. Ehab's biggest influence in weightlifting was his father, after his passing Mohamed decided to dedicate his life to the sport.

Career

Olympics
At the 2016 Summer Olympics he competed in the men's 77 kg weight class, getting third place for the snatch and second place for clean & jerk, giving him a third place which was upgraded to silver in 2022 when the gold medalist was disqualified.

World Championships
In 2014 he won the silver medal in the Total for the 69 kg weight-class in the 2014 World Weightlifting Championships, lifting 334 kg. He also won a bronze medal in the Snatch (152 kg) and silver in the Clean & Jerk (182 kg).

In the following year he competed in the 77 kg weight-class at the 2015 World Weightlifting Championships in Houston, winning a bronze medal in the total initially. The original silver medalist Kim Kwang-song failed a drug test and his lifts were disqualified, giving Ihab the silver medal to go along with a silver medal in the clean & jerk.

In 2017 he competed at the 2017 World Weightlifting Championships in the 77 kg category. He became World Champion, winning gold medals in all lifts, giving Egypt its first overall gold medal at the World Weightlifting Championships since Said Khalifa Gouda and Ibrahim Shams won gold medals in 1951.

In 2018 the International Weightlifting Federation reorganized the categories and Ihab competed in the newly created 81 kg category. In the snatch portion of the competition he lifted a new world record of 173 kg, which exceeded the world record set by Lü Xiaojun minutes earlier, this secured him the gold medal in the snatch. With his first two attempts of 196 kg and 200 kg in the clean & jerk portion he set two new world records of 369 kg and 373 kg in the total. This was not enough to win gold as Lü Xiaojun lifted 202 kg, giving him a 1 kg lead over Ihab as he won the silver medal.

In September 2019, Egypt was banned from participating in IWF competitions for two years due to doping offenses. Therefore, Ehab was not able to compete in the 2019 IWF championship and Tokyo 2020. In December 2021, he returned to competition in IWF world champions in Tashkent, Uzbekistan. He missed two of his snatch attempts. For the clean and jerk, he withdrew from the competition due to a shoulder injury.

Major results

References

External links
 
 

1989 births
Living people
Egyptian male weightlifters
World Weightlifting Championships medalists
Olympic weightlifters of Egypt
Olympic bronze medalists for Egypt
Olympic medalists in weightlifting
Medalists at the 2016 Summer Olympics
Weightlifters at the 2016 Summer Olympics
People from Faiyum
Mediterranean Games gold medalists for Egypt
Mediterranean Games medalists in weightlifting
Competitors at the 2018 Mediterranean Games
Competitors at the 2019 African Games
African Games gold medalists for Egypt
African Games medalists in weightlifting
Islamic Solidarity Games medalists in weightlifting
20th-century Egyptian people
21st-century Egyptian people